Stegastes aureus, the golden gregory, is a damselfish of the family Pomacentridae native to islands in the tropical Pacific Ocean, its range including New Caledonia, the Gilbert Islands, Line Island, Phoenix Island, Samoa, the Tuamotu Archipelago, and the Marquesas Islands.

References

aureus
Fish described in 1927